Tolumonas is a genus of Gram-negative bacteria. It grows under aerobic and anaerobic conditions and is nonmotile. The cells are rods and occur in pairs or singly. It is known for one of its species biological bacterial production of toluene from phenylalanine and other phenyl precursors

References

Aeromonadales
Bacteria genera